Enis Akaygen (1881–1956) was a Turkish diplomat, politician and a self-taught economist. He was the Turkish ambassador to Greece from October 1939 to July 1945.

References 

1881 births
1956 deaths
Politicians from Plovdiv
Republican People's Party (Turkey) politicians
20th-century Turkish politicians

Ambassadors of Turkey to Greece